Disporum viridescens is a species of flowering plant in the genus Disporum. Like other species in the genus, it grows from a rhizome. The leaves are more-or-less ovate in shape with a very short petiole (stalk). Flowering is in late spring to early summer (May to June in the northern hemisphere).

References

viridescens
Flora of Japan
Flora of Korea
Flora of China
Flora of Russia
Plants described in 1911